Welton may refer to:

Places

United Kingdom
Nether Welton, a place in Cumbria
Welton, Cumbria, a place in Cumbria
Welton, East Ayrshire, Scotland; a UK location
Welton, East Riding of Yorkshire
Welton, Lincolnshire
Welton Hill, a hamlet in above parish
Welton Cliff, a hamlet in above parish
Welton Rural District, a former rural district in Parts of Lindsey
Welton, Northamptonshire
Welton, Somerset
Welton le Marsh, Lincolnshire
Welton le Wold, Lincolnshire

Elsewhere
, a place in Mexico
Welton, Iowa, United States
Welton Township, Clinton County, Iowa, township containing Welton, Iowa
Wheeler, Wisconsin, United States (formerly called Welton)

People

People with the given name 
Wélton (footballer) (born 1975), Brazilian football forward
Welton Becket (1902-1969), American modern architect
 Welton Felipe (footballer, born 1986)
 Welton Felipe (footballer, born 1997)
Welton Gite, American bass guitarist
Welton Irie (born 1961), Jamaican reggae deejay
Welton Jones, American theatre critic
Welton Taylor (1919-2012), American microbiologist, inventor, and civil rights activist

People with the middle name 
 Lorenzo Welton Elder, MD (1820-1892), American physician and politician
 Kate Welton Hogg (1869-1951), Australian physician
 Miles Welton Lord (1919-2016), United States District judge
 Thomas Welton Stanford (1832-1918), Australian businessman, spiritualist and philanthropist
 Fred Welton Warmsley III (born 1987), American record producer and sound artist

People with the surname 
Alton Welton (1886–1958), American track and field athlete
Chauncey B. Welton (1844–1908), American politician
Doug Welton, American politician
Gilbert Welton, Bishop of Carlisle (1353–1362)
Guy Welton (born 1978), English cricketer
Hannah Welton (born 1990), American musician
Joan Welton (1930-2021), American actress and singer
John Welton (1929-2013), Canadian football player
Norman Welton (1928–2009), American journalist
Pat Welton (1928–2010), British football player
Richard Welton (1671/1672–1726), English Anglican non-juror
Stephen Welton (born 1961), founder and chairman of the Business Growth Fund
Theodore Allen Welton (1918–2010), American physicist
Thomas Abercrombie Welton (1835–1918), British statistician and chartered accountant
Tom Welton (born 1964), British chemist
William Welton (missionary) (1809–1858), English clergyman, physician, and surgeon
William Leslie Welton (1874–1934), American architect

Titles 
Elizabeth Sanderson, Baroness Sanderson of Welton, British political advisor, life peer, and journalist

Businesses and organizations 
 Cook, Welton & Gemmell, former shipbuilders based in Hull and Beverley, East Riding of Yorkshire
 Weltons Brewery, brewery founded in 1995 by Ray Welton

Railway stations 
 Welton railway station, former station for Welton and Watford in Northamptonshire
 Midsomer Norton and Welton railway station, former station on the Great Western Railway
 20th & Welton station, RTD light rail station in Denver, Colorado, United States
 25th & Welton station, RTD light rail station in Denver, Colorado, United States
 27th & Welton station, RTD light rail station in Denver, Colorado, United States
 29th & Welton station, former RTD light rail station in Denver, Colorado, United States

Other 
 Welton (1809), cargo ship wrecked 1817
 Welton Rovers F.C., Somerset County FA non-league football club

See also
 
 Weldon (disambiguation)